Walter Kohler may refer to:

 Walter J. Kohler Sr. (1875–1940), governor of Wisconsin (1929–1931) and president of the Kohler Company
 Walter J. Kohler Jr. (1904–1976), governor of Wisconsin, 1951–1957